TEDA Investment Holding Co., Ltd., known as TEDA Holding, is a Chinese state-owned enterprise based in Tianjin.

TEDA was the acronym of Tianjin Economic-Technological Development Area. The Chinese name  was in turn the transliteration of TEDA.

History
TEDA Holding, as the name suggested, was originally related to Tianjin Economic-Technological Development Area (acronym TEDA) as an investment vehicle of Tianjin Municipal People's Government. It was founded in 1984, after the marketization of China. It was renamed to the current name (from ) in 2001, after a merger with sister company TEDA Group and Tianjin TEDA Construction Group.

It was later expended to multiple sector, which now included football club, securities trading services, trust investment company and steel manufacturing.

Subsidiaries
source:
 Tianjin TEDA Group (100%)
 Tianjin TEDA Company (32.90%)
 Tianjin TEDA F.C. (85.4%)
 Tianjin Pipe Corporation (57%)

Equity investments
 Centre Plaza (Tianjin) (37%)
 China Bohai Bank (25%)
 Changjiang Securities

Financial data

References

External links
 

Conglomerate companies of China
Companies based in Tianjin
Conglomerate companies established in 1984
Chinese companies established in 1984
Companies owned by the provincial government of China